Tim Price (born 3 April 1979) is a New Zealand equestrian, competing in eventing. He is married to Jonelle Price (née Richards), also a New Zeland eventing rider. They are both competing at top international level.

Price was born in 1979 in Canterbury, New Zealand and educated at Rangiora High School. He travelled to the 2016 Summer Olympics in Rio de Janeiro as part of the reserve for individual and team eventing. Jock Paget withdrew on 5 August 2016 after his horse, Clifton Lush, cut its cheek at the Rio stable and did not recover in time for the event. Price and his horse Ringwood Sky Boy subsequently replaced Paget.

CCI***** results

International championship results

References

External links
 
 
 

1979 births
Living people
Olympic equestrians of New Zealand
Equestrians at the 2016 Summer Olympics
New Zealand male equestrians
New Zealand sportsmen
People educated at Rangiora High School
Equestrians at the 2020 Summer Olympics